Kondyurino is a rural locality (a village) in Kupriyanovskoye Rural Settlement, Gorokhovetsky District, Vladimir Oblast, Russia. The population was 86 as of 2010.

Geography 
Kondyurino is located 6 km southeast of Gorokhovets (the district's administrative centre) by road. Kruglovo is the nearest rural locality.

References 

Rural localities in Gorokhovetsky District